The Hălmăgel is a left tributary of the river Bănești in Romania. It discharges into the Bănești in Hălmagiu.

References

Rivers of Romania
Rivers of Arad County